"Magic" is a song by American rapper Future. Produced by K.E. on the Track, it was first released on March 3, 2011. The remix of the song features American rapper T.I. and was released on January 23, 2012, as the third single from Future's debut studio album Pluto (2012). The song's music video was released on January 31, 2012.

Charts

Weekly charts

Year-end charts

References

2011 songs
2012 singles
Future (rapper) songs
T.I. songs
Songs written by T.I.
Songs written by Future (rapper)
Epic Records singles
Songs written by K.E. on the Track
Song recordings produced by K.E. on the Track